The Australasian Society of Clinical Immunology and Allergy (ASCIA) is the peak professional body of clinical immunologists, allergy specialists, immunology scientists, and other health professionals working in allergy and immunology in Australia and New Zealand.

ASCIA's Mission is to "advance the science and practice of clinical immunology and allergy, by promoting education and the highest standard of ethical medical practice."

ASCIA was formed in 1991 by the merging of the Australian College of Allergy with the Australasian Society of Immunology Clinical Immunology Group.

ASCIA publishes guidelines and position statements on the management of allergy and other immune diseases, provides online training courses, online educational resources, hosts the ASCIA Annual Conference and other educational meetings.

References

About ASCIA (accessed 9 January 2020)

Medical associations based in Australia
Allergy organizations
Immunology organizations
1991 establishments in Australia